M. K. Raghavendra (born 24 December 1954, Bengaluru) is an Indian film/literary scholar, theorist, critic and writer who had, till 2016, authored six volumes on cinema, and contributed to numerous newspapers and periodicals in India and outside. He received the Swarna Kamal, the National Award for Best Film Critic in 1997.

Early writing 

Raghavendra, who has a master's degree in science and worked for over two decades in the financial sector, first attracted attention as a film critic when he became co-founder of the film journal Deep Focus, the other co-founders being AL Georgekutty, MU Jayadev and Babu Subramanian, who all wrote their first critical pieces on cinema for the journal around 1987–88. With AL Georgekutty as editor, Deep Focus was launched in December 1987 and made an immediate impact for the seriousness of its approach. The journal began as a quarterly but became irregular thereafter, sometimes coming out with only a single issue in an entire year. But Raghavendra was especially prolific in Deep Focus with his essays and reviews. Some of his major essays for Deep Focus were: ‘Urbanisation and Rootlessness: Adoor’s Drifters in Perspective’, ‘The Lost World of Andrei Tarkovsky’ ,‘RW Fassbinder: Notes on the Cinema of an Actor-Director’ ,‘Time and the Popular Film’ ,‘Generic Elements and the Conglomerate Narrative’ ,‘The Sins of a Pioneer: Satyajit Ray Re-examined’ ,  ‘The River as History: Ritwik Ghatak's Titash Ekti Nadir Naam' , and ‘The Dilemmas of Third World Cinema’. Part of this writing played a role in fetching him the National Award in 1997.

With Deep Focus becoming irregular, Raghavendra contributed a series of book reviews to the (now defunct) Indian Review of Books, published from Madras (now Chennai). Apart from reviewing books on film and media, he also took to reviewing fiction. Some of the writers he reviewed or wrote essays about were: Raja Rao, Salman Rushdie, Gabriel Garcia Marquez, Shobha De, Kiran Nagarkar, Vikram Seth, K V Puttappa, U R Ananthamurthy, SL Bhyrappa, Shivarama Karanth and Donald Richie (on Akira Kurosawa). Other subjects on which he wrote in the Indian Review of Books in the 1990s included American noir and science fiction. Since then he has also contributed book reviews to The Book Review, Caravan, The Hindu, Biblio: A Review of Books, Indian Economic & Social History Review and Economic and Political Weekly.

Theorizing on popular cinema 

Based on the work he had already done as a writer/ critic, Raghavendra was selected for a Homi Bhabha Fellowship in 1999, with the two-year scholarship to commence from January 2000. The subject chosen for his research was ‘Globalization and its effect on Indian popular film narrative.’ He completed his research in 2001 as scheduled but it took him several years to complete his first book on cinema. Seduced by the Familiar: Narration and Meaning in Indian Popular Cinema   was published by Oxford University Press in 2008 and partly developed on two essays written in Deep Focus. Seduced by the Familiar represents Raghavendra's first extended effort to understand popular cinema in a new way – i.e. neither as the output of authorial presences in the shape of directors nor as symptoms of psychological/social processes (psychoanalysis/ cultural studies) but rather as bodies of texts co-authored by a public to deal with socio-political concerns of their own. In film academics it departed from the work of scholars like M Madhava Prasad   by putting the theory-down approach aside and concentrating empirically on the formal/ narrative strategies used by the mainstream Hindi film to sustain the nation as an ‘imagined community’ (in Benedict Anderson's terms). Seduced by the Familiar, which eschews the usual jargon associated with academic writing on cinema and tries to be lucid, and is also important for two other things – an elaborate introduction charting the trajectory of scholarship on the mainstream Hindi film and a first chapter dealing with ‘narrative convention and form’. This chapter   remains the only rigorous attempt at defining an aesthetic for the Hindi popular film and relating it to traditional aesthetics, poetics and dramaturgy in India. Here is a passage pertaining to portrayal of devotion in the popular Hindi film:

“The idols worshipped in Hindu temples are conceived as objects of devotion and, while the Hindu gods are anthropomorphic, these idols are often mere cult symbols that do not imitate human proportions with any particular faithfulness. While the contention that idols are ‘symbolic’ may be contested, what is pertinent here is only that actual idols do not imitate human proportions faithfully. (Madhava) Prasad invokes the tradition of darsana in Hindu worship where muteness on the part of the devotee and mediation by a priest are pre-requisites but devout moments in Hindi films do not follow this prescription. The devoutness in popular cinema is usually directed towards idols that are sculpted in a (naturalistic, Western) way that makes their human attributes manifest. These gods are sometimes muscular and seem capable of movement where traditional idols are solid in their immobility. Where the object of worship in a usual Shiva temple is a sculpted lingam (a stone phallus) a Shiva temple in a popular film enshrines a ‘lifelike’ statue of the god. This does not mean that we do not see lingams in popular cinema. As an instance, the pre-title sequence in Satyam Shivam Sundaram (1978) shows people worshipping a wayside stone shaped like a lingam – to demonstrate that it is faith that renders the object of worship sacred. Yet, application to the divine in Satyam Shivam Sundaram is always made to anthropomorphic deities (usually Krishna and Radha) and devotion is also directed towards them in the song sequences. In many other films, the scenes are shot and edited during the devotee's address as though an actual dialogue was in progress. The entreating face of the character is cut to the reassuring countenance of the idol (often employing the eye-line match and shot-reverse shot editing) and the general sense is that there is a communion between the two…. the intention is not to introduce a god to 'control psychic dispositions' but one actually more mindful of material claims. What is presented is not only an icon more reassuring to the spectator but an accessible deity capable of intervening with human understanding in human stories."

Seduced by the Familiar has gained a following over the years and the paperback edition came out in 2015. In 2011 Raghavendra used the same discursive strategies on the Kannada film in another book also published by Oxford University Press – Bipolar Identity: Region, Nation and the Kannada Language Film. Kannada cinema ostensibly caters to audiences across Karnataka but this book demonstrates that it began by addressing those from the Princely State of Mysore before 1947 and continues, largely, to confine its address to the same territory. The approach of this book is therefore to examine Kannada cinema as local cinema addressing a public with 'dual identities', as it were, with loyalties to two different 'imagined communities' – those of former Mysore and of independent India, which often come into conflict. While the enquiry finds similarities between Hindi and Kannada cinema in terms of their respective grammar, there are nonetheless significant differences which come in the way of Kannada films being remade as Hindi films as easily as Tamil and Telugu films are. These differences lie partly in Kannada cinema coming from a smaller society in which caste plays a more defining role, marriages being contracted within endogamous circles (translating into 'arranged marriages' in narratives) and the territory being a former monarchy (under indirect British rule) with historical memories associated with it. The book also offers an explanation for the political importance of the Kannada film star Rajkumar. Seduced by the Familiar covers the whole of Hindi cinema from before1947 up till 2000 and Bipolar Identity looks at Kannada cinema over roughly the same period, associating the changing motifs with the region's social history. The book is likely to remain the definitive enquiry into the social meaning of Kannada cinema for some time.

The politics of Hindi cinema 

Both Seduced by the Familiar and Bipolar Identity are interested in the way social and political history are dealt with by film narrative and demonstrate that allegory is usually the chosen method. The books do not depend on Frederic Jameson's formulation that all 'Third World' texts should be read as national allegories but are independent enquiries which even throw some doubt on the entirety of Jameson's proposition. In the first place Indian films appear to function as allegories even before the 'nation' comes into existence (i.e. before 1947) and secondly, they are not always 'national' allegories but can also function as allegories of smaller territories – like the princely state of Mysore. Both books demonstrate how films follow or respond to social history but they do not look at how the films are themselves political or ideological tools. Raghavendra's slant on the politics of popular cinema changed significantly when he commenced to write for the Economic and Political Weekly (EPW) beginning with a piece on Rang De Basanti. Between 2009 and 2012 he wrote several essays for EPW (commentary section), on Kaminey, 3 Idiots, Raajneeti, Peepli (Live), Dabangg, Zindagi Na Milegi Dobara and Paan Singh Tomar. Ideology is a common aspect of mainstream Hindi cinema to engage researchers but where Raghavendra's writing differs is in his abandoning the theory-down (usually post-Marxist) approach and relying on textual analysis and looking at the internal dynamics of each text. Following his writing in EPW, he undertook the exercise of charting out the politics of mainstream Hindi cinema after 2000 with the neo-liberalist regime firmly in place. With the multiplex boom and the Anglophone Indian's economic importance because of globalisation and his/her being targeted because of his/her spending power, the issue was what direction Hindi cinema was taking, especially since it had been a national cinema after 1947. Could the nation addressed by the mainstream Hindi film be as inclusive as it had once been? His book The Politics of Hindi Cinema in the New Millennium: Bollywood and the Anglophone Indian Nation  appeared in 2014. Here is a political assessment from the concluding chapter which draws on textual evidence from mainstream Hindi cinema:

“Globalization and its economic outcome have divided Indian society as never before, with a globally attuned public in the metropolises finding itself closer to the Western world than it is to rural India. Since economic liberalization has been interpreted as licensed Darwinism, this (largely Anglophone) public has shut out the rest of India from its consciousness except as the Nation’s baggage. At the same time, (from the evidence of Dabangg) those in the semi-urban or rural areas are falling back to dependence on traditional power structures to which the weak state has lent authority. Economic liberalization was expected to create ‘trickle-down’ benefits to the marginalized but much of the ‘trickle-down’ affluence has further strengthened these informal power structures. The scenario is strikingly feudal but where feudal power once resided in the ownership of land, land is a depleting resource and its ownership may not confer the greatest degree of power. Power therefore comes out of political patronage, connections with state authority, and one's hereditary position in caste hierarchy.”

Popular criticism 

The work hitherto described is academic criticism but Raghavendra has also written articles/criticism for the lay reader in newspapers and periodicals like Deccan Herald, The Hindu, Caravan, Frontline, The Indian Express, Pioneer, Times of India and online publications like The Wire, Firstpost and Dearcinema. His first book of popular criticism was published by Collins in 2009–50 Indian Film Classics, which had individual essays dealing with a whole range of films from Franz Osten's Light of Asia a.k.a. Prem Sanyas (1925) to Rakeysh Omprakash Mehra's Rang De Basanti (2006). The collection of essays includes fiction features in a multitude of languages and genres, with examples as different as Salaam Bombay (Mira Nair, 1988), Samskara (Pattabhirama Reddy, 1970), Imagi Ningthem (Aribam Syam Sharma, 1981) and Amar Akbar Anthony (Manmohan Desai, 1977). Instead of adopting a uniform method, the essays examine each film from its most interesting side – e.g.: Kamal Amrohi's Pakeezah for its baroque aesthetic, Adoor Gopalakrishnan's Mukhamukham for its authorial perspective, and K Vishwanath's Telugu dance-musical Sankarabharanam for its ideological aspects.

Raghavendra followed up 50 Indian Film Classics with a companion piece also from Collins. In Director's Cut: 50 Film-makers of the Modern Era (2013)  he examines the work of film directors from across the world, but restricting his attention to those who produced notable work after 1960. The sixties were the years in which the French New Wave came of age and Raghavendra argues that the decade broadly marks the arrival of the ‘modern’ in cinema. Also, while the earlier film-makers – from Eistenstein to Hitchcock have been written about extensively, those more recent ones – like Bela Tarr from Hungary, Abbas Kiarostami from Iran and Sergei Paradjanov from the USSR have not had their work interpreted widely. The collection includes essays on five truly international Indian film-makers: Satyajit Ray, Ritwik Ghatak, Adoor Gopalakrishnan, G Aravindan and Raj Kapoor. Here is a passage from the essay on Ghatak:

“Apart from the sense of people living makeshift lives almost permanently Ghatak opens out the frame of his story (in Meghe Dhaka Tara) to admit detail that suggests a larger world not contained by the story. One motif is the train that features in several segments – including one or two in which Shankar practices music. If one were to compare Ghatak's train with Ray's in Pather Panchali, one could say that where Ray's is an emblem of the 'new', Ghatak's train is something that people have actually travelled in, perhaps from the homes they abandoned forever. Another device of Ghatak's is to have musical numbers in spaces open to the elements. Shankar and Neeta sing a duet in the film – a Tagore song – as if to recall a happier time or to wish for the way things might have been, sung under a thatched roof in a settlement. Tagore's songs are among the most cherished elements of Bengal's heritage and the sad irony that it should be sung under makeshift circumstances makes the sequence profoundly moving. In Subarnarekha (1962) Ghatak goes a step further and has the heroine rendering a song in an actual historical space – a dilapidated World War II airfield.”

Distinctions 

When Raghavendra received the National Award in 1997 the citation read as follows:
“For his provocative and iconoclastic writing, which inspires debate and discussion, so rare in film criticism today.”
The same ‘provocative’ tendencies continue to mark his later writing although he tries to be less judgmental. Why something is the way it (i.e. its socio-political implications) is more important than its value as cinema, is increasingly his emphasis. He was invited by Goethe Institut, Munich, July/ August 2000 to study post-war German Cinema, and his essay 'German Cinema at the Crossroads' was put on the internal web page of Goethe Instiut. He was also one of the two India-based film critics invited to participate in Sight and Sound, London, 2002 poll for greatest films of all time. His rise to stature as a scholar-critic has been increasingly acknowledged after his Homi Bhabha Fellowship. FIPRESCI the international federation of film critics included Seduced by the Familiar and 50 Indian Film Classics in its list of the Best Books on Cinema worldwide. When Oxford India decided to add 'Bollywood' to their list of 'Short Introductions' in 2016, he was asked to write the book, indicative of his growing authority in the field.

Writer-editor (incomplete) 

50 Indian Film Classics
Seduced by the Familiar: Narration and Meaning in Indian Popular Cinema
Bipolar Identity: Region, Nation and the Kannada Language Film
The Politics of Hindi Cinema in the New Millennium: Bollywood and the Anglophone Indian Nation
Director's Cut: 50 Major Film – Makers of the Modern Era
Bollywood (Oxford India Short Introductions Series)
Satyajit Ray (Harper 21)

Other academic writing (list incomplete) 

Convention and Form in Indian Popular Cinema, from K Gopinathan (ed.) Film and philosophy, Calicut: University of Calicut, 2003.
The entry for ‘Bollywood’ in Vinay Lal, Ashis Nandy (eds.) The Future of Knowledge and Culture: A Dictionary for the 21st Century, Penguin Viking, 2005.
Structure and Form in Indian Popular Film Narrative from Vinay Lal, Ashis Nandy (eds.) Fingerprinting Popular Culture: The Mythic and the Iconic in Indian Cinema, New Delhi: Oxford University Press, 2007.
Local Resistance to Global Bangalore: Reading Minority Indian Cinema, from K Moti Gokulsing, Wimal Dissanayake (eds.) Popular Culture in a Globalised India, London: Routledge, 2009.
Beyond ‘Bollywood’: Interpreting Indian Regional Cinema, from Sowmya Dechamma CC, Elavarthy Sathya Prakash (eds.) Cinemas of South India: Culture, Resistance, Ideology, New Delhi: Oxford University Press, 2010.
Region, Language and Indian Cinema: Mysore and Kannada Language Cinema of the 1950s, from Anjali Gera Roy and Chua Beng Huat (eds.) Travels of Bollywood Cinema: From Bombay to LA, New Delhi: Oxford University Press, 2012.
Naxalism in Cinema: The Absent Community, from Pradip Basu (ed.) Red on Silver: Naxalites in Cinema, Kolkata: Setu Prakashani, 2012.
Mainstream Hindi Cinema and Brand Bollywood: The Transformation of a Cultural Artifact, from Anjali Gera Roy (ed.) The Magic of Bollywood: At Home and Abroad, New Delhi: Sage, 2012.
The Reinterpretation of Historical Trauma: Three Films about Partition, from Sukalpa Bhattacharjee, C Joshua Thomas (eds.) Society, Representation and Textuality: The Critical Interface, New Delhi: Sage, 2013.
Kannada Cinema and Princely Mysore, from K Moti Gokulsing, Wimal Dissanayake (eds.) Routledge Handbook of Indian Cinemas, London: Routledge, 2013.

Participation in seminars/workshops (list incomplete) 

Workshop on Cinema and Television conducted by the Embassy of France, Nandan, Calcutta, July 1990.
Seminar on ‘Cinema and Violence’ conducted by Max Mueller Bhavan, Hyderabad in February 1992. Presented a paper on Mira Nair's Salaam Bombay.
Seminar on the stage production of Rashomon directed by Manipuri stage director Heisnam      Kanhaialal at Rangayana, Mysore, June 1993.
Seminar on Art Criticism in Udupi, Karnataka, October 1999. Presented a paper on Art Reviewing/Criticism in English
National Seminar on ‘Crossways in Criticism,’ February 2000, organised by Thunchan Memorial Trust and MT Vasudevan Nair at Tirur, Kerala. Presented a paper on new Indian fiction in English Vikram Seth's An Equal Music.
National Seminar on 'Cinema and philosophy,' Calicut University, Presented a paper 'Convention and Form in Indian Popular Cinema,' September 2000.
Seminar on 'Confluence of Indian Aesthetics,' Indian Institute of Science, Bangalore, February 2001.
Media Seminar: Max Mueller Bhavan, New Delhi, March 2001
Seminar on ‘Cultural Imperialism’ at Max Mueller Bhavan, New Delhi, February 2002.
National Seminar on Post-colonial Translation, Department of Humanities and Social Sciences, Indian Institute of Technology, Kharagpur, March 2003. Presented Paper 'Plagiarizing for Bollywood'.
National seminar on 'Translation and Location' at Vishwabharati, Santiniketan in Feb–March 2004. Presented paper 'Relocating Melodrama'.
National seminar on 'European Artists in Exile in America,' Vishwabharati, Santiniketan, Nov 2005. Presented paper 'Fritz Lang's The Big Heat: The German Roots of American Noir.’
National Seminar on ‘Cinemas of South India: Culture, Resistance, and Ideology,’ Centre for Comparative Literature and Department of Communications, University of Hyderabad, February 2008.
International Seminar on 'Travels of Indian Cinema: At Home and Abroad,’ Asia Research Institute, National University of Singapore, February 2009.
International Seminar on 'Bollywood's Soft Power' at the Indian Institute of Technology, Kharagpur, 2009.
International Seminar on 'Society and Literature: Interdisciplinary Transactions,’ North Eastern Hill University, Shillong, March 2010.
National Seminar on ‘100 Years of Indian Cinema,’ Sri Shankaracharya University of Sanskrit, Kalady. February 2013. Presented a paper on Indian Cinema in the Global Milieu: Popular Appeal and Artistic acceptance.
International Seminar on ‘Beyond the human: Monsters, Mutants and Lonely Machines,’ at Jawaharlal Nehru University, New Delhi, February 2014. Presented a paper 'Glitches in Mankind's Imagined Future: The Russian SF Film and Narratives of the Nation.’
International Seminar on ‘The Idea of India in the 21st Century: Cinematic Perspectives’ at IIAS, Shimla, May 2015. Presented a paper ‘The Fragmentation of National Cinema.’

Speaker at conferences (list incomplete) 

Talking Films: A Panel discussion with Rakeysh Omprakash Mehra, organised by Moving Images, at Hyderabad, 2007.
Film Critics Circle of India panel, 'Does technology kill good cinema and sensitivity?'IFFI, 2014, Panaji, Goa.
'Indian Cinema Bole Tho', Panel Discussion on 8 January 2013 at Taj Banjara, Hyderabad, hosted by Kalakriti Art Gallery and Moving Images.
Bangalore Literary Festival, September 2013
Hyderabad Literary Festival, January 2015.
Lekhana: A Literary Weekend, Bangalore, January 2015.
Keynote address at National Seminar on Middle Aesthetics, Middle Class and South Indian Cinema, Dept of Media at Central University of Tamil Nadu, Thiruvarur, February 2016.
Keynote address at event Celebrating 50 years: The Cinema of Adoor Gopalakrishnan, IFFK, Tiruvanthapuram, December 2016.

Membership of Juries 

Member of the jury for the Indian Panorama 1998 by Government of India. Jury headed by M.T.Vasudevan Nair, as chairman.
Member of jury for Indian Panorama 2004 – documentary and non-feature films. Chairman: Mike Pandey.
Member of FIPRESCI Jury at Thessaloniki International Film Festival, November 2007.
Member of FIPRESCI Jury at Zanzibar International Film Festival, July 2008.
Member of National Critic's Jury at Mumbai International Film Festival (MIFF) 2008.
Member of FIPRESCI Jury Leipzig International Film Festival for Documentaries and Animated Films, October 2009.

Teaching/Visiting Faculty 

Raghavendra has been visiting faculty at various institutions including Indian Institute of Management (Bengaluru), Shrishti School of Art and Design, Mauritius Film Development Corporation, Vishwabharati, Santiniketan, Alliance Francaise de Bangalore and the University of Hyderabad.

Phalanx: A Quarterly Review for Continuing Debate 

Raghavendra is also the Founder-Editor of Phalanx, an online journal dedicated to debate. The journal commenced in June 2007 and has dealt with a variety of issues including politics, aesthetics, literature and history. In 2013 it was given the ISSN number 2320-1698. It is now an academic journal which places no restrictions on subject matter except that it should be broadly pertinent.

FIPRESCI 

Raghavendra has been a member of FIPRESCI, the International Federation of Film Critics. He was Secretary of the Indian chapter between 2013 and 2016. The President of the Indian chapter of FIPRESCI in this period was HN Narahari Rao.

References

Bibliography
 MK Raghavendra, Bipolar Identity: Region, Nation and the Kannada Language Film, New Delhi: Oxford University Press, 2011.
 Frederic Jameson, ‘Third World Literature in the Age of Multi-national Capitalism’ from C Kolb and V Lokke (eds.) West Lafayette, Indiana: Purdue University Press, 1987.
 MK Raghavendra, Globalism and Indian Nationalism, Economic and Political Weekly, Vol. 41, No. 16 ( 22–28 Apr. 2006), pp. 1503–1505.
 M K Raghavendra, Social Dystopia or Entrepreneurial Fantasy: The Significance of Kaminey, Economic and Political Weekly, Vol. 45, Issue No. 10, 6 March 2010.
 M K Raghavendra, India, Higher Education and Bollywood, Economic and Political Weekly, Vol. 44, Issue No. 38, 19 September 2009.
 M K Raghavendra, Raajneeti, Politicians and CEOs, Economic and Political Weekly, Vol. 45, Issue No. 28, 10 July 2010.
 M K Raghavendra, Peepli Live and the Gesture of Concern, Economic and Political Weekly, Vol. 45, Issue No. 39, 25 September 2010.
 M K Raghavendra, A Renewal of Faith: Dabangg and Its Public, Economic and Political Weekly, Vol. 46, Issue No. 06, 5 February 2011.
 M K Raghavendra, Zindagi Na Milegi Dobara, Delhi Belly and the Imagined Nation, Economic and Political Weekly, Vol. 46, Issue No. 36, 3 September 2011.
 M K Raghavendra, Paan Singh Tomar, the Nation and the Sportsperson, Economic and Political Weekly, Vol. 47, Issue No. 17, 28 April 2012.
 MK Raghavendra, The Politics of Hindi Cinema in the New Millennium: Bollywood and the Anglophone Indian Nation, New Delhi: Oxford University Press, 2014.
 MK Raghavendra, Director's Cut: 50 Film-makers of the Modern Era, Noida: Collins, 2013.
 http://www.sfp.pl/data/files/b5/76/b5760482b6bb509/Best_Books_on_Film_2010.pdf
 MK Raghavendra, ‘Bollywood’, New Delhi: Oxford India Short Introductions, 2016.

External links 
 National Film Awards Archives

Indian film critics
Best Critic National Film Award winners